The Darling Downs–Moreton Rabbit Board fence is a pest-exclusion fence constructed between 1893 and 1997 to keep rabbits out of farming areas in Queensland, Australia. It is managed by the Darling Downs–Moreton Rabbit Board.

History
In 1893, a rabbit-proof fence was commenced in Queensland. It was progressively extended through the years.

In 1997, a final segment was built connecting it to the Dingo Fence. It extends from Mount Gipps (near Rathdowney) to Goombi between Chinchilla and Miles.

As of 2021 the fence has been expanded to 555km of rabbit-proof fence running from Mt Gipps to Goombi.

The board has eight local councils Western Downs Region, Toowoomba Region, Southern Downs Region, Lockyer Valley Region, Ipswich, Logan, Scenic Rim Region and Gold Coast as members financing its operations.

See also
 Rabbit-proof fence, the much longer rabbit fence in Western Australia
 Rabbits in Australia

References

Further reading
 

Fences
Agriculture in Queensland
Buildings and structures in Queensland